Lady Wood is the second studio album by Swedish singer and songwriter Tove Lo. It was released on 28 October 2016 by Island Records. Lady Wood is considered the first half of a two-piece concept album that describe "highs, lows and ultimate demise of a relationship." Its chapters "Fairy Dust" and "Fire Fade" precede the chapters "Light Beams" and "Pitch Black" from her following album Blue Lips (2017). It was recorded between July 2015 and May 2016, which Lo commented was a quicker turnaround than the "whole life" she was afforded when creating her previous record Queen of the Clouds (2014).

The tracks that begin each chapter are instrumental compositions by The Struts member Ludvig Södberg ("Fairy Dust"), and Ilya Salmanzadeh ("Fire Fade"). Except for these introductory tracks, Lo co-wrote the album's 10 songs. The album features new collaborations with producers Ilya, Oscar Holter, Oscar Görres, Rickard Göransson, and Joel Little, and guest vocals from rapper Wiz Khalifa, and fellow singer-songwriter, Joe Janiak. Two short films complemented the album's two chapters. The first, Fairy Dust, was released on 31 October 2016, and was followed by Fire Fade on 25 August 2017. These short films focus on a fictionalized, self-destructive version of Lo while expanding on the album's lyrical themes. Both short films were produced by Diktator, written by Lo and Tim Erem and directed by Erem.

"Cool Girl" was serviced as the lead single from Lady Wood on 4 August 2016, reaching number 15 in Sweden and number 84 on the US Billboard Hot 100. "True Disaster" was released on 15 November 2016 as the album's second single. The album peaked at number 11 on the US Billboard 200, becoming her highest-charting album in the country to date. To promote the album, Lo embarked on her second tour, Lady Wood Tour.

Background and composition
Lady Wood was inspired by "the chase, the rush, the peak, and the downfall [of the] emotional rollercoaster" Lo experienced since her extended play Truth Serum and debut studio album Queen of the Clouds were released in 2014. The album consists of two chapters: "Fairy Dust", which details the euphoria surrounding a gratifying encounter, and "Fire Fade", which highlights a subsequent sense of self-awareness. Lo announced Lady Wood is to be the first half of a two-piece album, with the third and fourth chapters "Light Beam" and "Pitch Black" to be included on Lo's third studio album in 2017.

Release
On 17 August 2016, Lo revealed that her second studio album would be titled Lady Wood and would be released on 28 October. About the title, Tove Lo recalls "writing the bridge of the title track, and thinking that I wanted to say, like, 'You're turning me on,' but I wanted to find another word. Like, what's the word for a female hard-on? I think I heard it in a movie somewhere—they were just like, 'You give me wood.' And I was like, 'Girl wood, or, Lady wood! Yes!'"

Promotion
The lead single from the album, "Cool Girl", was released on 4 August 2016, reaching number 15 in Sweden and number 84 on the US Billboard Hot 100.

"Influence" was released on 9 September 2016 as the first promotional single from the album. The song features American rapper Wiz Khalifa. "True Disaster" was originally released on 14 October 2016 as the second promotional single. The song was sent to US contemporary hit radio on 15 November 2016 as the album's second single.

Tour

On 23 October 2016, five days prior to the release of the Lady Wood, Lo announced North American and European headlining Lady Wood Tour, with special guests Phoebe Ryan and Broods, to promote the album. Various South American dates, Australian dates, other miscellaneous concerts, and festival dates were later announced at different times. The tour kicked off on 6 February 2017 in Seattle, Washington.

Fairy Dust and Fire Fade

The trailer for Fairy Dust, a short film based on the first half of the album, was unveiled on 17 October 2016. The full short film for Fairy Dust was released on 31 October 2016. A short film for the second half of the album, titled Fire Fade, was released on 25 August 2017.

Critical reception

Lady Wood received generally positive reviews from critics. At Metacritic, which assigns a normalised rating out of 100 to reviews from mainstream publications, the album received an average score of 74, based on 16 reviews. Entertainment Weeklys Madison Vain praised the album as "the darkest, weirdest, most irresistible pop record of the fall" and wrote, "While Lo's lyrics are stark and intensely personal, the music sounds engineered for the masses." Writing for NME, Nick Levine commented that "[s]ome listeners may not warm to Lo's persona, but her songwriting skills are difficult to fault", adding that "she keeps the hooks coming throughout as her hip, minimal electro-pop quivers, shimmers, pulses and throbs." Alim Kheraj of DIY noted that "Lady Wood isn't an album made for radio or easy digestion. The hooks are there but, like Tove herself, they aren't succumbing expectations."

Heather Phares of AllMusic remarked that "despite its provocative title, [Lady Wood] often feels more straightforward than Queen of the Clouds did." Sal Cinquemani of Slant Magazine concluded that "Lady Wood is admirably lean and tightly focused, and though it doesn't boast confessionals on the order of Like a Prayers, it offers a peek inside the psyche of a smart, burgeoning young star." Katherine St. Asaph of Pitchfork stated that "Lady Wood is short, but Lo finds ample darkness to plumb." The Observers Kitty Empire expressed that "Lady Wood is, if anything, classier than Queen of the Clouds. But it might not sell so well, in that it lacks the sleazy catnip—the sex clubs, the self-abasement—displayed in the latter's defining singles."

Track listing
Credits adapted from the album's liner notes and Tidal

Notes
  signifies a remixer

Personnel
Credits adapted from the liner notes of Lady Wood.

Musicians

 Tove Lo – vocals 
 Wiz Khalifa – vocals 
 The Struts – programming, bass, keyboards, guitars, percussion 
 Oscar Holter – programming, bass, keyboards, guitars, percussion 
 Ludvig Söderberg – programming, bass, keyboards, guitars, percussion 
 Joe Janiak – vocals, guitar 
 Ilya – programming, arrangement, bass, keyboards, guitars, percussion 
 Joel Little – programming, bass, keyboards, guitars, percussion 
 Ali Payami – programming, drums, keyboards, bass, guitar, all other instrumentation 
 Oscar Görres – programming, bass, keyboards, guitars, percussion

Technical

 The Struts – production 
 Noah Passovoy – vocal recording 
 Oscar Holter – production 
 Ludvig Söderberg – production ; executive production
 Ilya – production 
 Sam Holland – engineering 
 Jeremy Lertola – engineering assistance 
 Cory Bice – engineering assistance 
 Joel Little – production 
 Ali Payami – production 
 Oscar Görres – production 
 Tove Lo – executive production
 Serban Ghenea – mixing 
 John Hanes – engineering for mix
 Tom Coyne – mastering 
 Randy Merrill – mastering assistance

Artwork

 Tim Erem – creative direction
 Tove Lo – creative direction
 Samuel Burgess-Johnson – art direction, design
 Serena Neo – art direction, design
 Matt Jones – photography

Charts

Weekly charts

Year-end charts

Release history

Notes

References

2016 albums
Albums produced by Ilya Salmanzadeh
Albums produced by Joel Little
Concept albums
Island Records albums
Tove Lo albums
Tech house albums